"O Sacred Love of the Beloved Country" (Polish title: "Święta miłości kochanej ojczyzny"; also, "Hymn do miłości ojczyzny," "Hymn to Love of Country") is a patriotic poem by the Polish Enlightenment author and poet, Ignacy Krasicki, published in 1774. It became one of Poland's national anthems.

History
Ignacy Krasicki (1735–1801) was the leading literary representative of the Polish Enlightenment—a prose writer and poet highly esteemed by his contemporaries, who admired his works for their plots, wit, imagination and fluid style. 

Krasicki read his poem, "O Sacred Love," at a Thursday Dinner hosted by King Stanisław August Poniatowski.  The poet published it in 1774 in Zabawy Przyjemne i Pożyteczne (Pastimes Pleasant and Profitable).  It subsequently became part of song 9 of his 1775 mock-heroic poem, "Myszeida" (The Mouseiad). 

Popular during the Enlightenment, Krasicki's patriotic poem became the anthem of the Warsaw Corps of Cadets. It has gone through many translations, including three into French.

Text and translation

The poem is written in lines of 11 syllables, in ottava rima (rhyming ab ab ab cc).

See also
Polish national anthems
Fables and Parables
Polish literature
Polish Enlightenment

Notes

References
Jan Zygmunt Jakubowski, ed., Literatura polska od średniowiecza do pozytywizmu (Polish Literature from the Middle Ages to Positivism), Warsaw, Państwowe Wydawnictwo Naukowe, 1979.
"Święta miłości kochanej ojczyzny," Encyklopedia Polski, p. 679.

Polish poems
1774 poems
Polish Enlightenment
Works by Ignacy Krasicki